The Senate of Iraq (Majlis al-A`yan) was the unelected upper house of the bicameral parliament established by the Mandatory Iraq's 1925 constitution. There were around twenty Senators, appointed for eight years by the King of Iraq. The Senate remained in existence until the 1958 revolution.

Presidents of the Senate

Members
Members of the Iraqi Senate included:
 Menahem Saleh Daniel. Appointed 1925, representing Iraqi Jews. Remained member until 1932, when he was succeeded by his son.
 Jamil Sidqi al-Zahawi. Appointed 1925, remained member until 1929.
 Mawlud Mukhlis. Appointed 1925. Appointed vice-president of the Senate in 1936, though resigned in 1937 when he was elected Baghdad deputy to Parliament. He later returned to the Senate.
 Muhammad al-Sadr. Appointed 1925, remaining until his death in 1956. President of the Senate from 1929 until 1944, with the exception of 1937.
 Yousef VI Emmanuel II Thomas. Appointed 1925, representing the Chaldean Catholic Church. Remained member until his death in 1947, when he was succeeded by Yousef VII Ghanima.
 Rustum Haydar, appointed 1931.
 Ezra Menachem Daniel (1874-1952). Appointed member 1932, replacing his father; remained on the Senate until his death in 1952.
 Abdul Hadi Chalabi, appointed 1947.
 Ali Jawdat al-Aiyubi, appointed 1948–9. 
 Tawfiq Wahbi.
 Nureddin Mahmud, member from January 1953 to 1958.
 Sheikh Ahmad A.Yaseen AlAmer, appointed Mayor of Basra and Al Zubair province and Member of Parliament from 1945 - 1950|

See also
 Kingdom of Iraq
 Chamber of Deputies of Iraq

References

1920s establishments in Iraq
1958 disestablishments in Iraq
Iraq
Iraqi parliaments
Kingdom of Iraq
Organizations established in 1925
Organizations disestablished in 1958